This is a list of programs currently, formerly, and soon to be broadcast on the TV network Cuatro, in Spain.

References 

Lists of television series by network
Television stations in Spain
Spanish television-related lists